The Communist Party of India (Marxist–Leninist) (CPI (ML)) was an Indian communist party formed by the All India Coordination Committee of Communist Revolutionaries (AICCCR) at a congress in Calcutta in 1969. The foundation of the party was declared by Kanu Sanyal at a mass meeting in Calcutta on 22 April, Vladimir Lenin's birthday. Later the CPI(ML) party splintered into several Naxalite groups.

Origin
The CPI (ML) was formed by the radicals within the Communist Party of India (Marxist) (CPM) who grew concerned by the increasingly parliamentary character of its politics. A debate ensued where the radicals accused the CPM leadership of turning towards revisionism. Finally, the party purged the radicals, who went to form the CPI (ML). The CPI (ML) advocated armed revolution and denounced participation in the electoral process. Its leaders were Charu Majumdar and Saroj Dutta, both of whom had belonged to the left-wing within the CPM in northern West Bengal. Sanyal, Jongol Santhal and his followers had mobilised a revolutionary peasants movement in Naxalbari, which evolved into an armed uprising of the mostly Santhal tribal inhabitants. CPI (ML) saw Naxalbari as the spark that would start a new Indian revolution, and the movement came to be known as "naxalites". In several parts of India, for example Uttar Pradesh, Bihar, other parts of West Bengal, and in Srikakulam in northern Andhra Pradesh, the CPI (ML) organised guerrilla units. The party got moral support from China, which actively encouraged the attempts of CPI (ML) to launch revolution.

According to Pradip Basu in his book Towards Naxalbari (1953-1967): An Account of Inner-Party Ideological Struggle:

"There were two nuclei of radicals in the party organisation in West Bengal. One 'theorist' section around Parimal Das Gupta in Calcutta, which wanted to persuade the party leadership to correct revisionist mistakes through inner-party debate, and one 'actionist' section led by Charu Majumdar and Kanu Sanyal in North Bengal. The 'actionists' were impatient, and strived to organize armed uprisings. According to Basu, due to the prevailing political climate of youth and student rebellion it was the 'actionists' which came to dominate the new Maoist movement in India, instead of the more theoretically advanced sections."

Naxalbari uprising 

It occurred in Naxalbari of Siliguri subdivision, Darjeeling district under the leadership of communist leaders like Charu Majumdar and others who later became the part of CPI (ML).

Srikakulam peasant uprising 

In the Srikakulam district of Andhra Pradesh, communist leaders aligned themselves with the then formed AICCCR and launched peasant upsurge in Srikakulam which continued for almost 5 years in late 1960s and early 1970s.

After 1970

The first party congress was held in Calcutta 1970. A Central Committee was elected. As a result of both external repression and a failure to maintain internal unity, the movement did however degenerate into extreme sectarianism. Instead of popular armed struggle in the countryside, individual terrorism in Calcutta became a principal method of struggle. In 1971 Satyanarayan Singh revolted against the leadership, "individual killing of people branded as class enemy" and sectarianism of Majumdar. The result became that the party was split into two, one CPI (ML) led by Satyanarayan Singh and one CPI (ML) led by Majumdar. In 1972, frail and broken Majumdar died of multiple diseases in police custody; after his death a series of splits took place during the major part of the 1970s. The naxalite movement suffered a period of extremely harsh repression that rivalled the Dirty Wars of South America at the same time that the movement got all more fragmented.

After Majumdar's death the CPI (ML) central committee split into pro- and anti-Majumdar factions. In December 1972 the Central Committee of the pro-Charu Majumdar CPI (ML) led by Sharma and Mahadev Mukherjee adopted resolution to follow the line of Charu Majumdar unconditionally which others did not agree to. The pro-Charu Majumdar CPI (ML) later split into pro- and anti-Lin Biao factions. The pro-Lin Biao faction became known as Communist Party of India (Marxist–Leninist) (Mahadev Mukherjee) and the anti-Lin Biao-group later became known as Communist Party of India (Marxist–Leninist) Liberation and was led by Jauhar, Vinod Mishra, Swadesh Bhattacharya.

Legacy
Today, there exist a large number of political organisations whose roots are in the AICCCR/CPI (ML). Only C.P.I (M-L) faction led by Mahadev Mukherjee follows Charu Majumdar's concept of armed revolution and annihilation, whereas others have condemned the excesses of the sectarian epoch. All the organisations belonging to the later category have established legal overground structures (trade unions, student groups, peasant organisations, etc.) and started participating in elections.

Splinter Groups
Current parties and organisations with origins in CPI (ML) include
Communist Party of India (Maoist)
Communist Party of India (Marxist–Leninist) Liberation led by Dipankar Bhattacharya
Communist Party of India (Marxist-Leninist) Red Star led by K.N. Ramchandran
Marxist-Leninist Party of India (Red Flag) led by P.C. Unnichekkan
Communist Party of India (Marxist–Leninist) Class Struggle
Communist Party of India (Marxist-Leninist) New Democracy led by Yatendra Kumar
Communist Party of India (Marxist–Leninist) People's Liberation
Communist Party of India (Marxist-Leninist) Somnath led by Somnath Chatterjee Ukhra and Pradip Banerjee
Communist Party of India (Marxist-Leninist) Shantipal
Provisional Central Committee, Communist Party of India (Marxist-Leninist)
Communist Party of United States of India led by Veeranna
Communist Party of India (Marxist-Leninist) Janashakti - Koora Rajanna led by Koora Rajanna
Communist Party of India (Marxist-Leninist) Janashakti - Ranadheer led by Ranadheer
Communist Party of India (Marxist-Leninist) Janashakti - Chandra Pulla Reddy led by Chandra Pulla Reddy
Communist Party of India (Marxist-Leninist) (Mahadev Mukherjee) led by Mahadev Mukherjee
Communist Party of India (Marxist–Leninist) Praja Pantha
Communist Party of India (Marxist–Leninist) Jan Samvad
Communist Party of India (Marxist–Leninist) Nai Pahal
Communist Party of India (Marxist–Leninist) New Proletarian
Communist Party of India (Marxist–Leninist) Maharashtra
Communist Party of India (Marxist–Leninist) Bhaijee
Communist Party of India (Marxist–Leninist) Prajashakti
Communist Party of India (Marxist–Leninist) Prathighatana
Communist Party of India (Marxist–Leninist) Praja Pratighatana

References

External links 
 Banned Thought - India documents and statements of CPI (ML)

Naxalite–Maoist insurgency
Political parties established in 1969
Political parties disestablished in 1972
1969 establishments in West Bengal
1972 disestablishments in India
Anti-revisionist organizations
Stalinist parties
Maoist organisations in India
Defunct communist parties in India
Left-wing militant groups in India
Political parties in West Bengal
Communist Party of India (Marxist) breakaway groups